Su Ching-chuan (born 5 August 1957) is a Taiwanese physician and politician. He lost the 2008 legislative election, won election to the Legislative Yuan in 2012, and contested the Pingtung County magistracy in 2018 and 2022.

Medical career
Su earned degrees from Chung Shan Medical University, and became superintendent of Antai Tian-sheng Memorial Hospital in Donggang, Pingtung. His term as a member of the Eighth Legislative Yuan overlapped with leadership as director-general of the Taiwan Regional Hospital Association, and Taiwan Medical Association. In 2014, when Su and fellow legislator Liao Kuo-tung accused National Taiwan University Hospital and physician Ko Wen-je of unethical organ harvesting practices, a petition calling for Su's resignation from the Taiwan Medical Association was distributed. William Lai and Yeh Ching-chuan also commented on the allegations levied by Su and Liao. Though the petition was delivered to the Taiwan Medical Association, Su remained an organization executive. He was later named honorary superintendent of Antai Tian-sheng Memorial Hospital.

Political career
Su contested the 2008 legislative election as a Kuomintang candidate from Pingtung County's third district, losing to Pan Men-an.

He placed tenth on the Kuomintang party list in the 2012 legislative election, and was elected to the Legislative Yuan via proportional representation. As a legislator, Su was active in discussions regarding medical topics. He supported efforts for Taiwan's full membership in the World Health Organization, as well as a wider range of participation in other international organizations. Su commented on the subject of Chen Shui-bian's mental health while Chen was imprisoned, opining that the cell Chen was held in was too small. His medical training was considered a good fit for the Social Welfare and Environmental Hygiene Committee, and he had been named the committee convenor by May 2013. In 2014, Su criticized a number of organizations backing medical reform, stating that activists should attempt to establish hospitals that fulfill idealized working conditions and salaries to prove that such medical institutions would be sustainable. In January 2015, an amendment to the Fisheries Act proposed by Su passed, waiving a requirement that Taiwanese maritime employers pay health insurance premiums for foreign employees dating back to 2009.

In 2013, Su backed an amendment to an environmental impact assessment, permitting the proposed projects to continue in water catchment areas near reservoirs. In 2014, he voted against an amendment to the Water Pollution Control Act that would have raised fines for violations of the act.

During the 2014 Taiwan food scandal, Su raised questions about the import of waste cooking oil, and opined that such oils were safe to use. During a 2015 review of Japanese food products produced near the Fukushima Daiichi Nuclear Power Plant, the site of the Fukushima nuclear disaster in 2011, Su called for a boycott of all Japanese foodstuffs.

Following the Guang Da Xing No. 28 incident in 2013, he proposed that the Taiwanese government utilize air and naval forces to protect Taiwanese fishing boats during the bluefin tuna season, from March to June. He described the Philippines as "a gangster" and "a savage country." When the Sheng Fong No. 12, a Taiwanese vessel, was flagged for inspection by the Philippine Coast Guard in 2015, Su stated that the Taiwanese government should demand the immediate and unconditional release of the boat and its crew.

Though it was reported in March 2015 that Su was considering running for reelection to the Legislative Yuan from his native Pingtung County, by August, his willingness to contest a geographical constituency in Southern Taiwan had been reduced. Su's placement on the party list was still considered likely weeks before the list was due to be finalized.

He contested the Pingtung County magistracy in 2018, losing to incumbent Pan Meng-an. Su ran for the same office in 2022. He garnered 206,460 votes (46.59%) to Democratic Progressive Party candidate Chou Chun-mi's 217,537 votes (49.09) with New Power Party candidate  finishing third at 19,156 votes (4.32%). After the preliminary results were announced, Su claimed that there were several errors in the vote counting process and petitioned for a recount. The Pingtung District Court dismissed Su's request on 8 December 2022.

Personal life
The Control Yuan reported in 2014 that Su owned 74 plots of land and 12 buildings, held NT$38.2 million in savings, NT$2.9 million in stocks, and  investments in funds and other legal entities totaling NT$8.7 billion.

References

1957 births
Living people
Taiwanese hospital administrators
Members of the 8th Legislative Yuan
Kuomintang Members of the Legislative Yuan in Taiwan
Party List Members of the Legislative Yuan
Chung Shan Medical University alumni
Politicians of the Republic of China on Taiwan from Pingtung County
Taiwanese physicians